Queen Victoria Square is a public square located in the centre of Kingston upon Hull, England. The square is dedicated to Queen Victoria, and contains numerous buildings including Hull City Hall, the Maritime Museum and Ferens Art Gallery. A statue of Queen Victoria, designed in 1903 by  J. S. Gibson also stands in the square, and is listed Grade II.

References 

Squares in England
Parks and open spaces in Kingston upon Hull
Tourist attractions in Kingston upon Hull